D. montana may refer to:

Deconica montana, mountain moss psilocybe, a mushroom
Deudorix montana, a butterfly in the family Lycaenidae
Downingia montana, the Sierra calicoflower, a flowering plant species native to California
Drepanosticta montana, a damselfly in the family Platystictidae
Drosophila montana, a fruit fly in the family Drosophilidae